The AD 1048 Yellow River flood was a natural disaster along the Yellow River in China caused by the failure of a fascine at Shanghu.

After five years of failed efforts to restore the river to its previous course following the 1034 flood, the Song attempted to change their strategy and adjust their flood control efforts along the river's new paths in 1041.

This was not yet complete when the 1048 flood shifted the river's main course sharply, overtaking the Hai River and further damaging the empire's northern provinces. Their revenues were reduced to about one-fifth their pre-1034 level. This course lasted until 1194. During this century and a half, the coast around modern Tianjin moved forward about 23 kilometers.

References

Yellow River flood, 1048
Yellow River flood, 1048
Yellow River flood, 1048
Yellow River floods
11th-century floods